Alan Wallace (1 April 1891 – 10 May 1915) was a gifted New Zealand scholar and sportsman.

Wallace was born in Auckland in 1891. His parents were George and Florence Wallace. His father worked at Devonport Gas Works and he grew up on Lake Road in that suburb. He attended  Auckland Grammar School from 1903 and excelled academically in mathematics, science, and languages. In sport, his main discipline was cricket. His headmaster, James Tibbs, described him as "a lad endowed in no ordinary degree with moral and intellectual force". He won a large number of scholarships and in the junior university scholarship, which he gained when he entered Auckland University College, he came second in the country. He graduated with a Master of Arts in 1912 and gained a Rhodes Scholarship, which enabled him to study mathematics at Balliol College, Oxford. Aged 20 when he became a Rhodes Scholar, he was then the youngest scholar from New Zealand.

Wallace  played three first-class matches for Auckland between 1910 and 1912. He was killed in action during World War I. Other sports that he competed in were association football, swimming, rowing, and shooting.

Wallace was still at Balliol College when WWI started. He enlisted on 24 September 1914 and he was assigned to the British Section of the New Zealand Expeditionary Force. By Christmas of that year, he had arrived in Egypt. He arrived at Gallipoli on 25 April 1915. For his part of rescuing injured soldiers on 2 and 3 May, he was recommended for the Distinguished Conduct Medal. On 9 May while discussing plans with Major Hugh Quinn, Wallace was shot in the head by a sniper. He died the following day and was buried at sea.

See also
 List of Auckland representative cricketers
 List of cricketers who were killed during military service

References

External links
 
 

1891 births
1915 deaths
New Zealand cricketers
Auckland cricketers
Cricketers from Auckland
New Zealand military personnel killed in World War I
New Zealand Military Forces personnel of World War I
New Zealand Army soldiers
People educated at Auckland Grammar School
University of Auckland alumni
New Zealand Rhodes Scholars
Gallipoli campaign